Charlotta Ehrenpohl (1841-1914), was a Swedish Bridgettines nun and painter.

She converted to Catholicism in 1875. In 1877, she entered to Brigettine convent Maria Haart in Weert in The Netherlands. She became known as a painter, making religious paintings for churches and convents.

References

1841 births
1914 deaths
Swedish nuns
Bridgettine nuns
19th-century nuns
19th-century Swedish painters